IL-3 may refer to:

 Interleukin 3
 Illinois's 3rd congressional district
 Illinois Route 3

See also 

 Il Tre, or Il 3